Muhammad Ould Fahfu al-Massumi (c. 1913 – July 17, 2018), Sidi Muhammad Bin Salik Ould Fahfu al-Amsami, better known as Murabit al-Hajj was a Mauritanian Islamic scholar who devoted his life to worship, learning and teaching Islamic sciences. Teachers and students from around the world would often travel to study under his guidance. Based in a remote village in Mauritania, he trained hundreds if not thousands of scholars, including Hamza Yusuf.

The Muslim 500 Mention 
In 2016, he was selected by The Royal Islamic Strategic Studies Centre amongst 'The 500 Most Influential Muslims'.

Family

He was married to Maryam Bint Muhammad al-Amin Ould Muhammad Ahmad Bwayba Maryam Bint Bwayba, who memorized the entire Qur’an.

References

1913 births
2018 deaths
21st-century Muslim scholars of Islam
Mauritanian Muslims
Place of birth missing
20th-century Muslim scholars of Islam
Mauritanian centenarians
Men centenarians